Franklin Commercial Historic District is a national historic district located at Franklin, Johnson County, Indiana. The district encompasses 32 contributing buildings in the central business district of Franklin. It developed between about 1850 and 1935, and includes notable examples of Italianate, Romanesque, and Classical Revival style architecture. Located in the district is the separately listed Johnson County Courthouse. Other notable buildings include the Herriott-Clarke Building (1853), former City Hall and Opera House (1895), Artcraft Theater (1924), and Wigwam Mineola Tribe Building (c. 1915).

It was listed on the National Register of Historic Places in 1989.

References

External links

Historic districts on the National Register of Historic Places in Indiana
Italianate architecture in Indiana
Neoclassical architecture in Indiana
Romanesque Revival architecture in Indiana
Historic districts in Johnson County, Indiana
National Register of Historic Places in Johnson County, Indiana
1989 establishments in Indiana